Scott William Rasmussen  (born March 30, 1956) is an American public opinion pollster and political analyst. He previously produced the ScottRasmussen.com Daily Tracking Poll, a gauge of American voters' political sentiment. He is editor-at-large for Ballotpedia, where he writes the Number of the Day Feature, and is a host for the podcast entitled "Just the Polls," a podcast series from Just the News.

Rasmussen was the founder of Rasmussen Reports, where he served as pollster and president for 10 years until leaving the company in 2013. Earlier in his professional life, Rasmussen co-founded the sports network ESPN. After leaving Rasmussen Reports, Rasmussen founded Rasmussen Media Group, working as a political analyst, author, public speaker and columnist.

Rasmussen is a New York Times bestselling author and speaker, and he writes a weekly column for the Deseret News. His most recent book publication is entitled The Sun is Still Rising: Politics Has Failed But America Will Not and was released in 2018.

Early life and education
Rasmussen was born on Eglin Air Force Base near Valparaiso, Florida to Lois Ann and Bill Rasmussen. Scott's father was from Chicago, Illinois and attended DePauw University in Indiana, where he met Scott's mother.

From an early age, Rasmussen was exposed to the broadcasting business through his father, who had worked for radio stations and was a communications director for the New England Whalers ice hockey team. With the help of his father, Rasmussen taped his first radio commercial at the age of seven.

Rasmussen grew up spending summers in Ocean Grove, New Jersey with his grandparents. He got his first job at age 14 as an umbrella boy. He later served as an announcer for the New England Whalers of the World Hockey Association. Rasmussen's childhood idol was hockey legend Gordie Howe. Around that time he was emcee for Howe's 50th birthday celebration in 1978, which Rasmussen cites as a highlight of his life: "nothing in my professional career will ever equal the thrill of celebrating [his] birthday."

Rasmussen graduated from Minnechaug Regional High School in 1974 and was goaltender for the high school hockey team. He started college at the University of Connecticut, taking a class from professor Everett Ladd, a pollster and political scientist.

Rasmussen earned a bachelor's degree in history at his father's alma mater, DePauw University in Greencastle, Indiana, graduating in 1986, and later an executive MBA from the Babcock Graduate School of Management at Wake Forest University.

Career

ESPN 
In 1978, Rasmussen partnered with his father, Bill, to form an exclusively sports-devoted 24-hour cable television network. The network was initially named "Entertainment and Sports Programming Network," but was changed to "ESPN" to shorten its length. Five years later, the Rasmussen's ownership stake in ESPN was bought out by Texaco, who thereafter sold ESPN to ABC for $237 million. They went on to found the Enterprise Radio Network. Rasmussen and his father later had a falling out over what Rasmussen called unspecified "differences."

Polling 
Rasmussen first became known for his public opinion polling work. In the 1990s, he volunteered as a pollster for friends who were attempting to impose congressional term limits. In 1995, he founded a polling company called GrassRoots Research. In 1999, after changing the name to Rasmussen Research, the company was bought by TownPagesNet.com for about $4.5 million in ordinary shares.

Rasmussen Reports 

In 2003, Rasmussen founded Rasmussen Reports, LLC, a U.S.-based public opinion polling company, to track consumer confidence, investor confidence, and presidential approval. Rasmussen Reports has been called "one of the most consistently interesting polling and analytics companies," generating a daily cycle of news reports based on original survey results as well as political, business, economic and lifestyle content. Unlike traditional pollsters whose polls are often influenced by partisanship, the company's business model relies on website advertising and paid subscriptions for premium content. Rasmussen Reports' polls are notable for their use of automated public opinion polling, involving pre-recorded telephone inquiries, which have been shown to produce accurate results at low cost.

In 2009, Noson Lawen Partners provided a significant investment in Rasmussen Reports to help expand its daily, automated tracking polls, noting the "rock solid credibility and market-leading accuracy of the Rasmussen Reports product suite." In 2010, Rasmussen Reports was one of two firms providing daily tracking updates of the president's job approval ratings as well as consumer confidence. By 2012, Rasmussen Reports had garnered a national reputation for providing "reliable, newsworthy and actionable public opinion data," receiving over one million visits per day during the presidential election that year.

In July 2013, Rasmussen left his position as president of Rasmussen Reports following disagreements with investors over business strategies. In a press release from Rasmussen Reports, the company confirmed Rasmussen's departure and said, "[i]n part, the move reflects disagreements over company business strategies .... The Company emphasized that Mr. Rasmussen's legacy remains intact. His polling methodologies and protocols, widely acknowledged as among the most accurate and reliable in the industry, continue to guide and inform the company’s public opinion survey techniques. In addition, the editorial culture of excellence that he built is still very much in place."

The Washington Post referred to Rasmussen as "a driving force in American politics" and "an articulate and frequent guest on Fox News and other outlets, where his nominally nonpartisan data is often cited to support Republican talking points." In the Wall Street Journal, political journalist John Fund called him "America's insurgent pollster".

Susan Estrich, the first female campaign manager of a major presidential campaign, said of him, "If you really want to know what people in America think, you can't find a smarter guy to ask than Scott Rasmussen."

Rasmussen has described himself as "an independent pollster" who "[l]ike the company he started, [...] maintains his independence and has never been a campaign pollster or consultant for candidates seeking office." Speaking about the use of his polling data by Republicans, in 2009 Rasmussen said, "Republicans right now are citing our polls more than Democrats because it’s in their interest to do so. I would not consider myself a political conservative — that implies an alignment with Washington politics that I don’t think I have."

In 2010, some Democrats criticized Rasmussen's polling methodology. Democratic pollster Mark Mellman said Rasmussen Reports polls "tend to be among the worst polls for Democrats." Tom Jensen, a pollster for Democratic firm Public Policy Polling said: "The way [Rasmussen] does polls is that he's more likely to get high-energy voters. I think Rasmussen favors Republicans this year, but I don't think he inherently favors Republicans."

Rasmussen Media Group
After his departure from Rasmussen Reports in 2013, Rasmussen announced the creation of Rasmussen Media Group to "develop and invest in digital media opportunities." Rasmussen Media Group said that the "new venture reflects a transition from Rasmussen's role as a scorekeeper in the nation's political dialogue to becoming a more active participant," especially in critiquing "crony capitalism and the unholy alliance between big government and big business."

ScottRasmussen.com
In August 2018, Rasmussen released his new public opinion website, ScottRasmussen.com. The website debuted in conjunction with the announcement of a partnership between ScottRasmussen.com and HarrisX, an online research company under The Stagwell Group, which was founded by former pollster and adviser to President Bill Clinton, Mark Penn. Beyond polling and analysis regarding approval ratings and congressional races, the venture also focuses on public sentiment and awareness of other issues, such as socialism and immigration. According to an August 2018 press release, ScottRasmussen.com and HarrisX produce a Daily Tracking Poll that seeks to "zero in on foundational public attitudes rather than the partisan politics that frequently define Washington discourse."

Since the launch, Rasmussen and ScottRasmussen.com have been cited for their polling insights by Newsweek, The Wall Street Journal, and The Hill, among others.

Styrk.com
In 2014, Rasmussen launched Styrk.com, a digital news service which functioned as a multi-channel news platform and social network. Former Miss America Kirsten Haglund served as Styrk.com's lead anchor. Styrk.com's tagline was "news in the language of everyday Americans." Styrk.com ceased operations on March 16, 2016.

Works

Books
In 2010, Rasmussen co-authored a book with pollster Douglas Schoen, Mad as Hell: How the Tea Party Movement is Fundamentally Remaking Our Two-Party System, explaining the causes of Tea Party movement's frustrations, namely excessive federal spending, high taxes, and a failure of politicians in Washington to listening to the people.

In his 2010 book titled In Search of Self-Governance, Rasmussen argued that Americans would rather govern themselves rather than being governed from the left, the right, or even center and this desire for self-governance is under assault by elites in Washington, D.C. and Wall Street."

Rasmussen's 2012 book, "The People's Money: How Voters Will Balance the Budget and Eliminate the Federal Debt," argues through polling data, that the federal government does not have the consent of the governed. The book reached number 17 on the New York Times Bestseller List in March 2012.

In 2018, Rasmussen authored a book entitled The Sun is Still Rising: Politics Has Failed But America Will Not. While expressing a general sense of pessimism as to the political process in America, Rasmussen makes a case for the "legitimacy" of optimism in the virtual and psychical communities outside of Washington, D.C. that allow the talents of individuals flourish. Jonathan Rauch, senior fellow at the Brookings Institution, said of the book: "in this optimistic, open-hearted book, Scott Rasmussen delivers a spirited and timely reminder that civic groups, innovative businesses, and personal networks are where the real action will be in the 21st century—and that their potential to improve our lives and our country is vast."

Columns
Rasmussen's work has appeared in USA Today, The Washington Post, The Los Angeles Times, The Boston Globe, Investor's Business Daily, the Christian Science Monitor and other major publications. Rasmussen also writes a weekly syndicated newspaper column through Creators Syndicate and gives daily syndicated news updates through WOR Radio Network. Rasmussen's columns incorporate public opinion polling data and public policy issues. He is also regularly quoted in print and online publications, including USA Today, The Wall Street Journal, and The Los Angeles Times.

Rasmussen has independently authored several Wall Street Journal columns, including a piece on how Obama won the White House by campaigning like Ronald Reagan and an overview of the healthcare reform debate.

Television
In 2010 he made an appearance on Comedy Central's The Colbert Report.

From 2012 through 2013, Rasmussen hosted a syndicated television show called What America Thinks With Scott Rasmussen with WCBS-TV. An episode of the show titled What New Hampshire Thinks won a 2012 Granite Mike Award from the New Hampshire Association of Broadcasters.

In February 2018, Rasmussen participated as a panelist in a televised discussion moderated by former Hewlett-Packard Chairman and CEO Carly Fiorina, discussing the implications and impact of the recently enacted tax reform package.

Radio
In April 2012, WOR Radio Network began syndicating three different one-minute daily news updates by Rasmussen.

Personal life
Rasmussen lives in Florida with his wife, Laura. He has a son, Phillip "PJ," who is an accomplished jazz guitarist in the New Jersey and New York City areas.

Speaking about his political views, Rasmussen said, "I was brought up loosely as a Republican, but at our family dinner table we talked about the important politics of the New York Giants and the New York Yankees. There was no political discussion in my life growing up. I became a Democrat after Richard Nixon and into the Jimmy Carter era and have been an Independent ever since. I spoke today about how the American people were skeptical about politicians—well, I'm more skeptical. I really do see the core issue as the political class versus mainstream voters. I think that is a much bigger gap than Republican, Democrat, conservative, or liberal."

In March 2010, Rasmussen's home was destroyed by a fire. Rasmussen noted thereafter that his local community—the "local government, our insurance company, our church, local businesses, our neighbors and the kindness of strangers"—were instrumental in the recovery process. Rasmussen also cited this experience as an inspiration for the "upbeat message" in his book, Politics Has Failed: America Will Not.

From 2006–2011, Rasmussen served as volunteer president of the Ocean Grove Camp Meeting Association (OGCMA), "a ministry organization whose mission is to provide opportunities for spiritual birth, growth, and renewal in a Christian seaside setting." OGCMA is affiliated with the United Methodist Church.

Bibliography
 Politics Has Failed: America Will Not. Sutherland Institute. 2017. .
 
 
  (with Doug Schoen)

References

External links
 
 Biography at Ballotpedia
 

Living people
1956 births
Place of birth missing (living people)
American people of Danish descent
University of Connecticut alumni
Wake Forest University alumni
DePauw University alumni
American television executives
ESPN executives
Pollsters
American political writers
American male non-fiction writers
People from Valparaiso, Florida
American United Methodists